Mike Perko (born March 30, 1957) is a former American football defensive tackle. He played for the Atlanta Falcons in 1982 and for the Birmingham Stallions from 1984 to 1985.

References

1957 births
Living people
American football defensive tackles
Utah State Aggies football players
Atlanta Falcons players
Birmingham Stallions players